Germanic sound shifts are the phonological developments (sound changes) from the Proto-Indo-European language (PIE) to Proto-Germanic, in Proto-Germanic itself, and in various Germanic subfamilies and languages.

PIE to Proto-Germanic 
 Germanic spirant law
 Grimm's law
 Holtzmann's law
 Sievers' law
 Verner's law
 Kluge's law

In Proto-Germanic 
 Germanic a-mutation

Germanic subfamilies and languages 
 Germanic umlaut (all of the early languages except for Gothic)
 Great Vowel Shift (English)
 High German consonant shift
 Ingvaeonic nasal spirant law (attested in Old English, Old Frisian and Old Saxon)
 West Germanic gemination

See also 
 Germanic languages
 Germanic substrate hypothesis

Germanic languages
Sound laws